The Mari are a Finnic people, who have traditionally lived along the Volga and Kama rivers in Russia. Almost half of Maris today live in the Mari El republic, with significant populations in the Bashkortostan and Tatarstan republics. In the past, the Mari have also been known as the Cheremisa or the Cheremis people in Russian and the Çirmeş in Tatar.

Name 
The ethnic name mari derives from the Proto-Indo-Iranian root *márya-, meaning 'human', literally 'mortal, one who has to die', which indicates early contacts between Finno-Ugric and Indo-Iranian languages.

History

Early history 
Some scholars have proposed that two tribes mentioned by the Gothic writer Jordanes in his Getica among the peoples in the realm of Gothic king Ermanaric in the fourth century CE can be equated with the Mari people. However, the identification of the Imniscaris (or Sremniscans) with "Cheremis", and Merens with "Mari" is controversial. The first safely attested mention of the Mari people comes from Khazar sources from the 10th century, where they appear by the exonym tsarmis (= "Cheremis"). At that time, the Mari settlement area was along the Volga. In the 13th century, the Mari fell under the influence sphere of the Golden Horde, and in 1443 became subjects of the Kazan khanate. During this time, the Maris experienced some cultural convergence with the ruling Tatars and the Volga Bulgars, which is also seen in Turkic lexical and grammatical influence on the Mari language.

In 1552, the Mari territory was incorporated into Russia with the Russian conquest of Kazan under Ivan the Terrible. While some Maris (mostly Hill Maris) assisted the Russian conquest, the majority of the Maris fought back in the so-called "Cheremis Wars". By the end of the 16th century, resistance was finally quelled, leaving a heavy toll on the Mari population. As a result of the ensuing influx of Russian settlers, and to escape forced Christianization (starting from  1700), Maris started to settle further east in present-day Bashkortostan. In the following centuries under tsarist Russia, the Maris were able to retain their ethnic and cultural identity, reinforced by repeated waves of returning to their traditional pre-Christian religion.

Soviet Union 
During the Soviet Era, the Mari Section was set up under the auspices of Narkomnats, the Peoples Commissariat for nationalities. Its task was to facilitate the close union of the Mari people with other people, to abolish anti-Russian mistrust and to raise the "class consciousness" of Mari workers. In practice this involved facilitating grain requisitions by the Soviet state, the recruitment of soldiers for the Red Army and the implementation of Bolshevik control of the society.

During the Soviet Era, Bolshevik policies officially aimed at combating undue influence of nationalism in a multi-nation union, resulted in the murder of leading Mari figures, such as Sergei Čavajn and Olyk Ipai and other teachers, scientists, artists, as well as religious and community leaders.

Russian Federation 

Following the collapse of the Soviet Union, the newly created republic of Mari El saw a revival of Mari culture and language. However, following the appointment of Leonid Markelov as Head of the republic in 2001, the government of Mari El has pursued a policy of intense Russification in the region. According to Vasily Pekteyev of the Mari National Theater in Yoshkar-Ola, "[Markelov] hated the Mari people". He noted that the Mari language is no longer taught in villages or schools and that the republic of Mari El "has already ceased to be an ethnic republic in anything but name. We are just another oblast." In 2005, the European Commission expressed its concern over reports of repression against ethnic Mari opposition figures, journalists, and government officials that promoted Mari culture and opposed Markelov's reappointment as head of the republic that year.

Ethnic groups 
The Mari people consists of four different groups: the Meadow Mari, who live along the left bank of the Volga, the Hill (Mountain) Mari, who live along the right bank of the Volga, the Northwestern Mari, who live in Southern part of Kirov Oblast and Eastern part of Nizhny Novgorod Oblast, and Eastern Mari, who live in the Bashkortostan, Tatarstan, Udmurtia republics and Perm Krai and Sverdlovsk Oblast. In the 2002 Russian census, 604,298 people identified themselves as "Mari," with 18,515 of those specifying that they were Mountain Mari and 56,119 as Eastern Mari. Almost 60% of Mari lived in rural areas.

Language

The Mari have their own language, also called Mari, which is a member of the Uralic language family. It is written with a modified version of the Cyrillic alphabet. Linguists today distinguish four different dialects, which are not all mutually intelligible: Hill Mari (мары йӹлмӹ), concentrated mainly along the right Volga bank; Meadow Mari (марий йылме), spoken in the lowland regions of the Kokshaga and Volga rivers, which includes the city of Yoshkar-Ola; Eastern Mari, spoken east of the Vyatka River; and Northwestern Mari (маре йӹлмӹ) in the South-West of Kirov Oblast and North-East of Nizhny Novgorod Oblast.

In the 2002 census, 451,033 people stated that they spoke the Mari language.

Religion 

Maris have traditionally practiced a shamanistic faith that closely connected the individual with nature. According to those beliefs, nature exerts an influence over people. Nature is seen as a sacred, powerful, and living being with which people are fully intertwined. Nature also serves as a source of absolute good who always helps humans as long as they refrain from harming or opposing it.

The Mari native religion also possesses a pantheon of gods who reside in the heavens, the most important of whom is known as the Great White God (Ош Кугу Юмо, Osh Kugu Yumo). Other lesser gods include the god of fire (Тул Юмо, Tul Yumo) and the god of wind (Мардеж Юмо, Mardezh Yumo). The Mari also believe in a number of half-men, half-gods (керемет, keremet) who live on earth. The most revered of these is Chumbulat (Чумбулат), or Chumbylat (Чумбылат), a renowned leader and warrior.

Attempts to convert the Maris to Christianity began in the 16th century after their territory was incorporated into the Russian Empire during the reign of Ivan IV "the Terrible". Pressure to convert to Christianity and adopt Russian culture by the tsarist authorities in the 17th and 18th century led to backlash by the Maris as they faced persecution to conform. Adoption of Christianity was not universal, however, and many Mari today still practice paganism in syncretic forms,  While most Mari today are members of the Russian Orthodox Church, pagans still comprise a significant minority of 25 to 40% of the population.

Genetics 
Osteopetrosis affects 1 newborn out of every 20,000 to 250,000 worldwide, but the odds are much higher in the Russian region of Mari El with 1 of every 14,000 newborns affected.

See also 
 Mari language
 Mari Ushem

References

External links 
 MariUver, a blog about Mari culture and issues
 The Moscow Times: 'Europe's Last Pagans' Worship in Marii-El Grove
 RT Documentary: Europe's Last Pagans, an English-language video documentary
 Photo story, 2014
 Ural Mari. There's No Death, a project about traditional culture and believes of the Ural Mari

 
Ethnic groups in Russia
Indigenous peoples of Europe
Mari El
Volga Finns
Members of the Unrepresented Nations and Peoples Organization
Indigenous peoples of the Subarctic